Protrelloididae is a family of nematodes belonging to the order Rhabditida.

Genera:
 Napolitana Kloss, 1959
 Protrellatus Farooqui, 1970
 Protrelleta Chitwood, 1932
 Protrelloides Chitwood, 1932

References

Nematodes